The following is a list of album appearances by Puerto Rican rapper Daddy Yankee. Only albums that do not have Daddy Yankee as a primary artist are eligible. The Year column indicates the year in which the album was released, not the song. The Album column indicates the first studio album in which the song was part of the track listing. Compilation or Greatest hits albums are eligible only if a song was not included on any studio album.

List

See also
Daddy Yankee discography

References

Album appearances
Lists of albums